Suillia tuberiperda, the truffle fly, is a European species of heleomyzidae.

Its larvae develop in truffles, a behavior exploited in the search for truffles. The eggs are deposited in the soil above the fruiting bodies, and the emerging larvae dig for the truffles.

References

Heleomyzidae
Diptera of Europe
Insects described in 1867
Taxa named by Camillo Rondani